Zagajdzie  is a village in the administrative district of Gmina Karczmiska, within Opole Lubelskie County, Lublin Voivodeship, in eastern Poland.

References

Zagajdzie